Ghost Machine is a British science fiction film, directed by Chris Hartwill and based on a screenplay by writer Sven Hughes and Malachi Smyth. It stars Rachael Taylor, Sean Faris and Luke Ford.

Plot
The film opens with a tied and hooded woman being take to some sort of jail run by the British military.

Nine years later, you see military technicians and video game freaks Tom and Vic performing a training exercise for several candidates special force.

They later smuggle their top-secret, virtual warfare program into a disused prison, to experiment with it using two of the candidates. And it is the same place seen nine years earlier.

What should first be a cool thrill becomes a deadly reality; a vengeful outsider has manipulated the software and kidnapped them. When their companion Jess hears of this case, it begins a seemingly hopeless rescue mission and is also drawn into this virtual world, which can be just as deadly as real war.

Cast
 Sean Faris as Tom
 Rachael Taylor as Jess
 Luke Ford as Vic
 Jonathan Harden as Benny
 Hatla Williams as Prisoner K
 Sam Corry as Iain
 Richard Dormer as Taggert
 Joshua Dallas as Bragg

Production
The film was shot in September 2008 in Northern Ireland in the city of Belfast at the Crumlin Road Gaol. It based on a storybook of British screenwriter Sven Hughes.

Soundtrack
The Score was composed by American country artist Bill Grishaw.

Release
Ghost Machine premiered on 1 February 2009 in the United Kingdom and was released in the United States as direct-to-video production on 22 December 2009 over Anchor Bay Entertainment.

References

External links
 

2009 films
2009 science fiction films
British science fiction films
Films shot in Northern Ireland
British ghost films
Films about virtual reality
2009 directorial debut films
2000s English-language films
2000s British films